Peter Elkmann (born 16 September 1981 in North Rhine-Westphalia, Steinfurt) is a German racing driver. He has competed in such series as the Formula Three Euroseries and the German Formula Three Championship.

Performer by Elkmann
Peter Elkmann launched his own racing car in 2015, the Performer 1000. The car is a more powerful version of a superkart. The car weighing in at 290 kg is powered by a 1000cc Suzuki GSX-R1000 engine. The car is allowed to race in the Seven Mania Racing Club and Carbonia Cup.

Racing record

Complete Formula 3 Euro Series results
(key) (Races in bold indicate pole position) (Races in italics indicate fastest lap)

References

External links
 Career statistics from Driver Database

1981 births
Living people
People from Steinfurt
Sportspeople from Münster (region)
German racing drivers
German Formula Three Championship drivers
Formula 3 Euro Series drivers
Racing drivers from North Rhine-Westphalia
German racecar constructors
Karting World Championship drivers
Jo Zeller Racing drivers
RC Motorsport drivers
Nürburgring 24 Hours drivers